Access All Areas: A Rock & Roll Odyssey is a documentary following rock band Bon Jovi on their successful New Jersey Syndicate Tour between 1988 and 1990. It contains live, backstage, and candid footage of the band, soundtracked with their music. The film was initially released on VHS in 1990 and on DVD in 2014 as part of the New Jersey: Super Deluxe Edition, along with New Jersey: The Videos.

Contents

 Introduction
 Show #3 / Dublin, Ireland
 Show #9 / Rome, Italy
 Italian TV Show
 Behind The Iron Curtan
 Moscow Music Peace Festival
 First Leg European Tour
 Rio de Janeiro, Brazil
 Tokyo, Japan
 All Star Jam, Wembley Arena, England
 In Store Signing / London, England
 Berlin, Germany
 Nordhoff Robbins Music Therapy Benefit
 Sydney, Australia
 The Homecoming
 Rare Club Dates
 Show #232 / The Last Gig
 "Livin' On A Prayer"
 Credits

Availability
 VHS
 LaserDisc
 DVD (exclusively as part of the Japanese Special Edition albums box set and New Jersey 2014 Super Deluxe Edition)

Additional information
 Access All Areas: A Rock & Roll Odyssey was also available as a double VHS feature which also contains the New Jersey: The Videos package.
 Access All Areas: A Rock & Roll Odyssey was released on DVD in 2010 exclusively to the Japan Special Editions box set, but includes Japanese subtitles embedded into the footage.

Certifications

References

Bon Jovi video albums
1988 video albums
Films about music and musicians